Proaracana dubia is an extinct, prehistoric aracanid boxfish that lived during the Lutetian of middle Eocene Monte Bolca.

See also

 Eolactoria
 Prehistoric fish
 List of prehistoric bony fish

References

Eocene fish
Eocene genus extinctions
Aracanidae
Fossils of Italy
Fossil taxa described in 1961